Multi TV is a privately owned satellite television station based in Ghana. The station offers a variety of news, sports and entertainment channel in digital format. It was set up in 2009 by the Multimedia Group Limited.

References

Television stations in Ghana
Satellite television
Mass media in Accra
Television channels and stations established in 2009